Montegrosso d'Asti is a comune (municipality) in the Province of Asti in the Italian region Piedmont, located about  southeast of Turin and about  southeast of Asti.

Montegrosso d'Asti borders the following municipalities: Agliano Terme, Castelnuovo Calcea, Costigliole d'Asti, Isola d'Asti, Mombercelli, Montaldo Scarampi, Rocca d'Arazzo, and Vigliano d'Asti.

References

Cities and towns in Piedmont